Benjamin Marcus Priteca  (23 December 1889 – 1 October 1971) was a Scottish architect. He is best known for designing theatres for Alexander Pantages.

Early life
Benjamin Marcus Priteca was born into a Jewish family in Glasgow on 23 December 1889. His nickname was "Benny". He served an apprenticeship in Edinburgh under architect Robert MacFarlane Cameron from 1904 to 1909, and earned degrees from the University of Edinburgh and the Royal College of Arts during this time. In 1909, he emigrated to the U.S. and settled in Seattle.

Career
Priteca met Seattle vaudeville theatre owner Alexander Pantages in 1910 and won a commission from him to design the San Francisco Pantages Theater (1911), the first of many so-named vaudeville and motion picture houses in what would become one of the largest theater chains in North America.

In all, Priteca designed 22 theaters for Pantages and another 128 for other theater owners. Notable theaters include the Coliseum (1915) in Seattle; the Pantages (1918) in Tacoma, Washington; the Pantages (1920) in Los Angeles, California (downtown); the Pantages in San Diego, California (1924); the Pantages (renamed The Orpheum) (1926) in San Francisco, California (downtown); the Pantages (1928) in Fresno, California; the Paramount (1929) in Seattle; the Pantages (1929) in Hollywood, California (the last and largest of the Pantages theaters); the Warner on Pacific Boulevard in Huntington Park, California (1930); the Admiral (1942) in West Seattle; and the Orpheum (1927) in Vancouver.

Priteca also designed the 1934 Grandstand and Clubhouse of Longacres Racetrack in Renton, Washington, which operated from 1935 to 1994 and has since been demolished. Pantages is said to have liked Priteca as a theater architect for his ability to create the appearance of opulence within a less-than-opulent budget. Pantages is quoted as saying, "Any damn fool can make a place look like a million dollars by spending a million dollars, but it's not everybody who can do the same thing with half a million."

Priteca's apprentices included Gregory Ain, who went on to success as a modernist architect (practicing in a very different manner). Ain worked with Priteca for a short time in the late 1920s and helped draw the Los Angeles Pantages. In 1951, Priteca became a Fellow of the American Institute of Architects. He remained active as an architect well into his later years, working as a consultant in the design of the Seattle Opera House (1962) and the Civic Auditorium (1968) in Portland, Oregon.

Death
Priteca died in Seattle on 1 October 1971, at the age of 81. His first name was mistakenly recorded as "Bernard" on his death certificate. He was posthumously awarded honorary membership of the Theatre Historical Society of America.

Works

Theaters
Coliseum (1915) in Seattle; the Pantages (1918) in Tacoma, Washington; 
Pantages (1920) in Los Angeles, California (downtown) 
Pantages in San Diego, California (1924) 
Pantages (renamed The Orpheum) (1926) in San Francisco, California (downtown) the Pantages (1928) in Fresno, California; 
 Paramount (1929) in Seattle
 Pantages (1929) in Hollywood, California (the last and largest of the Pantages theaters)
 Warner on Pacific Boulevard in Huntington Park, California (1930)
 Admiral (1942) in West Seattle; and the Orpheum (1927) in Vancouver

Other buildings
Chevra Bikur Cholim synagogue (1912) in Seattle, now the Langston Hughes Performing Art Center
Seattle's Crystal Pool natatorium (1916)
Alhadeff Sanctuary of Seattle's Temple De Hirsch Sinai
Civic Auditorium (now Keller Auditorium) in Portland
Longacres racetrack clubhouse and grandstand in Renton, Washington

Gallery

References

Biographical sketch of B. Marcus Priteca (with photographs) at Puget Sound Theatre Organ Society
 Statt, Daniel, Pantages, Alexander (1876-1936), HistoryLink.org Essay 2999, February 19, 2001, Corrected December 18, 2002. Accessed 10 March 2007.

External links

 

1889 births
1971 deaths
American theatre architects
Jewish architects
Architects from Seattle
Scottish emigrants to the United States
Scottish Jews
Architects from Glasgow
Fellows of the American Institute of Architects